Paik Jin-hyun (born 1 February 1958) is a South Korean judge and the current President of the International Tribunal for the Law of the Sea, inaugurated on October 2, 2017, succeeding Vladimir Vladimirovich Golitsyn from Russia.

Biography
Paik graduated from Seoul National University in 1980, later he entered both Columbia University and Cambridge University. Paik graduated from Cambridge in 1989 and was subsequently admitted to the bar of the State of New York. In March 2009, he became a member of the International Tribunal for the Law of the Sea. In October 2017, Paik became the tribunal's president.

Paik presided over a case relating to the Kerch Strait incident. On 25 May 2019 the tribunal decided that Russia must immediately release three captured ships and 24 captured Ukrainian servicemen.

References

External links 
 ITLOS - Judge Jin-hyun Paik Biography at the website of the ITLOS

1958 births
Living people
Chief justices
South Korean judges
International Tribunal for the Law of the Sea judges
South Korean judges of United Nations courts and tribunals
Alumni of the University of Cambridge
Columbia University alumni
New York (state) lawyers
People from Seoul
Seoul National University alumni